The 1913–14 season was Stoke's fifth season in the Southern Football League.

Stoke were now back in the poor quality Southern League Division Two and expectations were to gain an instant return to Division One. Stoke started the season well winning nine games in a row, however the team ran into poor form in the new year and ended up finishing 5th, 11 points from promotion. It was a bad performance and in April 1914 both chairman Mr Rev. A Hurst and manager Alfred Barker stepped down.

Season review

League
Division Two of the Southern League for the 1913–14 season was made up of selection of poor Welsh clubs and a smattering of sides from around the London area, namely Luton Town, Brentford and Croydon Common. There was no money available, meaning the club had to rely on free transfers. There were still a number of new faces with the likes of former England international Fred Pentland joining from Halifax, James Bradley returning from Liverpool and Billy Herbert from Glossop. With Stoke doing well from the start of the season crowds were often good as Stoke embarked on a nine match winning run. However long distance travelling eventually caused Stoke problems and they lost their form and ended up finishing in a poor position of fifth.

The directors, obviously disappointed as were the players and supporters, at not winning promotion, vowed to continue to build the team despite having little money available. Alfred Barker was now under pressure from supporters and indeed some directors who questioned his wisdom to employ part-time staff. He and chairman A. Hurst both stepped down in April 1914. It was a sad way to see such key figures, responsible for saving the club, leave in such circumstances.

FA Cup
After progressing past Shrewsbury Town and Barrow, Stoke lost to Aston Villa in the first round.

Final league table

Results

Stoke's score comes first

Legend

Southern Football League Division Two

FA Cup

Squad statistics

References

Stoke City F.C. seasons
Stoke